Crowthorne is a suburb of Johannesburg, South Africa. It is located in Region 2, in Midrand, between Pretoria and Johannesburg on the previously known Carlswald Agricultural Holdings. The region is surrounded by plots, horse breeding societies and agricultural activities; neighbouring areas like Beaulieu, Kyalami (and Waterfall Estate), Blue Hills etc. Crowthorne is known for the Crowthorne Shopping Centre, Crowthorne Lodge, new developments by Century Property Developments and several garden centres like the Plantland Nursery.

Most of the residential roads are still dirt roads, contributing to a rural atmosphere. The Denneboom chicken farm is situated between the Carlswald Meadows estate and the Carslwald North estate in Crowthorne.

Upmarket estates such as Montecello, Carlswald Meadows and Carlswald North are popular landmarks in this region. The R55 (Woodmead Rd extension) and Main Rd (which originates from Bryanston in Sandton) gives access to the Suburb as well as New Road when travelling from Pretoria side.

References

Johannesburg Region A